Susan Hobbs (born 1956/1957) is an Australian para-athlete and wheelchair basketball player. Hobbs was the first woman to captain the Australian women's wheelchair basketball team and was inducted into Basketball Australia's Hall of Fame in 2013.

She was from South Australia. In 1976, at the age of 19, a car accident left her a paraplegic. At the 1980 Arnhem Games, she competed in four athletics events and won three silver medals – Women's 60 m 5, Women's 800 m 5 and the Women's 1,500 m 5. She organised the first Australian women's wheelchair basketball team.   She was the captain of the women's basketball team at the 1992 Barcelona Games. Basketball Australia established the Sue Hobbs Medallist for the Australian International Women's Wheelchair Player of the Year.

In 1999, she was diagnosed with multiple sclerosis. After the symptoms prevented her from undertaking paid employment, she began volunteering for Multiple Sclerosis Society of SA and the Northern Territory Inc.

References

External links
 

1950s births
Living people
Paralympic athletes of Australia
Paralympic wheelchair basketball players of Australia
Australian female wheelchair racers
Paralympic silver medalists for Australia
Paralympic medalists in athletics (track and field)
Athletes (track and field) at the 1980 Summer Paralympics
Wheelchair basketball players at the 1992 Summer Paralympics
Medalists at the 1980 Summer Paralympics
People with paraplegia
People with multiple sclerosis
Sportswomen from South Australia